Alia Twal is a commercial airline pilot from Jordan. She flies for Royal Jordanian Airlines. In 2016, Twal was made a Liveryman in the Honourable Company of Air Pilots, becoming the fourth Jordanian to receive this position.

Biography 
Twal started learning to fly in 2006, graduating from the Ayla Aviation Academy in Aqaba, now known as Airways Aviation Academy. She was a flight instructor at the academy for three years before joining Royal Jordanian Airlines in 2011.

References 

Living people
Year of birth missing (living people)